Hiberno-English (from Latin Hibernia: "Ireland") or Irish English, also formerly Anglo-Irish, is the set of English dialects native to the island of Ireland (including both the Republic of Ireland and Northern Ireland).

In the Republic of Ireland, English is one of two official languages, along with the Irish language, and is the country's  working language. Irish English's writing standards, such as its spelling, align with British English. However, Irish English's diverse accents and some of its grammatical structures and vocabulary are unique, with some influences deriving from the Irish language and some notably conservative phonological features: features no longer common in the accents of England or North America. 

Phonologists today often divide Irish English into four or five overarching dialects or accents: Ulster accents, West and South-West Irish accents (like Cork accents), various Dublin accents, and a non-regional standard accent expanding since only the last quarter of the twentieth century (outside of Northern Ireland).

History
Old English, as well as Anglo-Norman, was brought to Ireland as a result of the Anglo-Norman invasion of Ireland of the late 12th century; this became the Forth and Bargy dialect, which is not mutually comprehensible with Modern English. A second wave of the English language was brought to Ireland in the 16th-century (Elizabethan) Early Modern period, making that variety of English spoken in Ireland the oldest outside of Great Britain, and it remains phonologically more conservative today than many other dialects of English. 

Initially, Norman-English was mainly spoken in an area known as the Pale around Dublin, with largely the Irish language spoken throughout the rest of the country. Some small pockets remained of speakers who predominantly continued to use the English of that time; because of their sheer isolation these dialects developed into later (now-extinct) English-related varieties known as Yola in Wexford and Fingallian in Fingal, Dublin. These were no longer mutually intelligible with other English varieties. By the Tudor period, Irish culture and language had regained most of the territory lost to the invaders: even in the Pale, "all the common folk… for the most part are of Irish birth, Irish habit, and of Irish language".

However, the Tudor conquest and colonisation of Ireland in the 16th century led to the second wave of immigration by English speakers along with the forced suppression and decline in the status and use of the Irish language. By the mid-19th century English had become the majority language spoken in the country. It has retained this status to the present day, with even those whose first language is Irish being fluent in English as well. Today, there is little more than one percent of the population who speaks the Irish language natively, though it is required to be taught in all state-funded schools. Of the 40% of the population who self-identified as speaking some Irish in 2016, 4% speak Irish daily outside the education system.

Ulster English

Ulster English (or Northern Irish English) here refers collectively to the varieties of the Ulster province, including Northern Ireland and neighbouring counties outside of Northern Ireland, which has been influenced by Ulster Irish as well as the Scots language, brought over by Scottish settlers during the Plantation of Ulster. Its main subdivisions are Mid-Ulster English, South Ulster English and Ulster Scots, the latter of which is arguably a separate language. 
Ulster varieties distinctly pronounce:
An ordinarily grammatically structured (i.e. non-topicalised) declarative sentence, often, with a rising intonation at the end of the sentence (the type of intonation pattern that other English speakers usually associate with questions).
 as fronted and slightly rounded, more closely approaching .
, almost always, as a slightly raised monophthong .
Syllable-final  occasionally as "dark [ɫ]", though especially before a consonant.

Notable lifelong native speakers
Christine Bleakley, Jamie Dornan, Rory McIlroy, Liam Neeson – "The Northern Irish accent is the sexiest in the UK, according to a new poll. The dulcet tones of Liam Neeson, Jamie Dornan, Christine Bleakley and Rory McIlroy helped ensure the accent came top of the popularity charts"
John Cole – "His distinctive Ulster accent"
Nadine Coyle – "I was born and raised in Derry and I can't change the way I talk".
Daniel O'Donnell – "the languid Donegal accent made famous by Daniel O'Donnell"
Colin Morgan – "Colin Morgan has revealed that fans of the show are often confused by his accent. The 23-year-old [...] is originally from Northern Ireland"

West and South-West Irish English

West and South-West Irish English here refers to broad varieties of Ireland's West and South-West Regions. Accents of both regions are known for:
The backing and slight lowering of  towards .

South-West Irish English (often known, by specific county, as Cork English, Kerry English, or Limerick English) also features two major defining characteristics of its own. The other is the intonation pattern of a slightly higher pitch followed by a significant drop in pitch on stressed long-vowel syllables (across multiple syllables or even within a single one), which is popularly heard in rapid conversation, by speakers of other English dialects, as a noticeable kind of undulating "sing-song" pattern.

Notable lifelong native speakers
Nicola Coughlan "She seamlessly switches from a soft Galway accent"
Robert Sheehan
Kerry Condon – "Tipperary accent"
Aisling O'Sullivan
Dolores O'Riordan – "singing in her Limerick accent"
Roy Keane – "Cork accent"
Dáithí Ó Sé – "his Kerry dialect"
The Rubberbandits – "Rubberbandits' strong Limerick city accent [...] sits on a frequency like a tambourine which can cut through any noise"
Roger Clarke "so I developed an Irish twang fairly quickly" "the family moved to just outside Sligo town when he was 12 years old"
Paul McGrath (footballer) "With a beautiful soft Irish accent"
The Clancy Brothers
Rachel Pilkington

Dublin English

Dublin English is highly internally diverse and refers collectively to the Irish English varieties immediately surrounding and within the metropolitan area of Dublin. Modern-day Dublin English largely lies on a phonological continuum, ranging from a more traditional, lower-prestige, local urban accent on the one end to a more recently developing, higher-prestige, non-local (regional and even supraregional) accent on the other end, whose most advanced characteristics only first emerged in the late 1980s and 1990s. The accent that most strongly uses the traditional working-class features has been labelled by linguists as local Dublin English. Most speakers from Dublin and its suburbs, however, have accent features falling variously along the entire middle as well as the newer end of the spectrum, which together form what is called non-local Dublin English, spoken by middle- and upper-class natives of Dublin and the greater eastern Irish region surrounding the city. A subset of this variety, whose middle-class speakers mostly range in the middle section of the continuum, is called mainstream Dublin English. Mainstream Dublin English has become the basis of an accent that has otherwise become supraregional (see more below) everywhere except in the north of the country. The majority of Dubliners born since the 1980s (led particularly by women) has shifted towards the most innovative non-local accent, here called new Dublin English, which has gained ground over mainstream Dublin English and which is the most extreme variety in rejecting the local accent's traditional features. The varieties at either extreme of the spectrum, local and new Dublin English, are both discussed in further detail below. In the most general terms, all varieties of Dublin English have the following identifying sounds that are often distinct from the rest of Ireland, pronouncing:
 as fronted and/or raised .
 as retracted and/or centralised .

Local Dublin English
Local Dublin English (or popular Dublin English) here refers to a traditional, broad, working-class variety spoken in the Republic of Ireland's capital city of Dublin.

New Dublin English
Evolving as a fashionable outgrowth of the mainstream non-local Dublin English, new Dublin English (also, advanced Dublin English and, formerly, fashionable Dublin English) is a youthful variety that originally began in the early 1990s among the "avant-garde" and now those aspiring to a non-local "urban sophistication". New Dublin English itself, first associated with affluent and middle-class inhabitants of southside Dublin, is probably now spoken by a majority of Dubliners born since the 1980s. It has replaced (yet was largely influenced by) moribund D4 English (often known as "Dublin 4" or "DART speak" or, mockingly, "Dortspeak"), which originated around the 1970s from Dubliners who rejected traditional notions of Irishness, regarding themselves as more trendy and sophisticated; however, particular aspects of the D4 accent became quickly noticed and ridiculed as sounding affected, causing these features to fall out of fashion by the 1990s. New Dublin English can have a fur–fair merger, horse–hoarse, and witch–which mergers, while resisting the traditionally Irish English cot–caught merger. This accent has since spread South to parts of East Co. Wicklow, West to parts of North Co. Kildare and parts of South Co. Meath. The accent can be also heard among the middle to upper classes in most major cities in the Republic today.

Standard Irish English
Supraregional Southern Irish English (sometimes, simply Supraregional Irish English or Standard Irish English) refers to a variety spoken particularly by educated and middle- or higher-class Irish people, crossing regional boundaries throughout all of the Republic of Ireland, except the north. As mentioned earlier, mainstream Dublin English of the early- to mid-twentieth century is the direct influence and catalyst for this variety, coming about by the suppression of certain markedly Irish features (and retention of other Irish features) as well as the adoption of certain standard British (i.e., non-Irish) features. The result is a configuration of features that is still unique; in other words, this accent is not simply a wholesale shift towards British English. Most speakers born in the 1980s or later are showing fewer features of this late-twentieth-century mainstream supraregional form and more characteristics aligning to a rapidly spreading new Dublin accent (see more above, under "Non-local Dublin English").

Ireland's supraregional dialect pronounces:
 as quite open .
 along a possible spectrum , with innovative [ɑɪ] particularly more common before voiced consonants, notably including .
 as starting fronter and often more raised than other dialects: .
 may be , with a backer vowel than in other Irish accents, though still relatively fronted.
 as higher, fronter, and often rounder .

Overview of pronunciation and phonology
The following charts list the vowels typical of each Irish English dialect as well as the several distinctive consonants of Irish English. Phonological characteristics of overall Irish English are given as well as categorisations into five major divisions of Hiberno-English: Ulster; West & South-West Ireland; local Dublin; new Dublin; and supraregional (southern) Ireland. Features of mainstream non-local Dublin English fall on a range between "local Dublin" and "new Dublin".

Monophthongs 
The following monophthongs are defining characteristics of Irish English:
  is typically centralised in the mouth and often rounder than other standard English varieties, such as Received Pronunciation in England or General American in the United States.
 There is a partial trap-bath split in most Irish English varieties (cf. Variation in Australian English).
 There is inconsistency regarding the lot–cloth split and the cot–caught merger; certain Irish English dialects have these phenomena while others do not. The cot-caught merger by definition rules out the presence of the lot-cloth split.
 An epenthetic schwa is often inserted between sonorants, e.g. film  and form , due to the influence of the Irish language.
{| class="wikitable" style="text-align:center"
|-
! Diaphoneme
! Ulster
! West & South-West Ireland
! Local Dublin
! New Dublin
! Supraregional Ireland
! Example words
|-
| flat 
| 
| colspan="2" | 
| 
| 
| add, land, trap
|-
|  and broad 
| 
| colspan="2" | 
| colspan="2" |  
| bath, calm, dance
|-
| conservative 
| 
| colspan="2" | 
| 
| 
| lot, top, wasp|-
| divergent 
| rowspan="2" | 
| colspan="2" rowspan="2" | 
| 
| 
| loss, off
|-
|
| 
| 
| all, bought, saw|-
| 
| colspan="5" | 
| dress, met, bread
|-
| 
| colspan="5" |
| about, syrup, arena|-
| 
| 
| colspan="4" | 
| hit, skim, tip
|-
| 
| 
| colspan="4" rowspan="2" |
| beam, chic, fleet
|-
|
|
| happy, coffee, movie|-
| 
| colspan="2" | 
| 
| 
| 
| bus, flood
|-
| 
| rowspan="2" | 
| colspan="4" | 
| book, put, should
|-
| 
| colspan="3" | 
| 
| food, glue, new|}Footnotes:In southside Dublin's once-briefly fashionable "Dublin 4" (or "Dortspeak") accent, the " and broad " set becomes rounded as [ɒː].

 In words like took where the spelling  usually represents , conservative speakers may use . This is most common in local Dublin and the speech of north-east Leinster.

Diphthongs
The following diphthongs are defining characteristics of Irish English:
The  diphthong, as in ow or doubt, may start more forward in the mouth in the east (namely, Dublin) and supraregionally; however, it may be further backwards throughout the entire rest of the country. In Ulster, the second element is particularly forward, as in Scotland.
The  diphthong, as in boy or choice, generally starts of lower outside of Ulster.
The words gave and came often have  instead, i.e. rhyme with "Kev" and "them".Footnotes: 

Consonants
The consonants of Hiberno-English mostly align to the typical English consonant sounds. However, a few Irish English consonants have distinctive, varying qualities. The following consonant features are defining characteristics of Hiberno-English: 
Some accents, realise them as dental stops  and do not merge them with alveolar , i.e. making tin and thin  a minimal pair.
Rhoticity: The pronunciation of historical  is universal in Irish English, as in General American (but not Received Pronunciation), i.e.  is always pronounced, even word finally and before consonants (e.g. here, cart, or surf).
Lack of Haitch-dropping and occurrence of  where it is permitted in Irish but excluded in other dialects of English, such as before an unstressed vowel (e.g. Haughey ) and word finally (e.g. McGrath ).
Syllable final and intervocalic  is pronounced uniquely in most Hiberno-English; the most common pronunciation is as a "slit fricative".

Local Dublin features consonant cluster reduction, so that plosives occurring after fricatives or sonorants may be left unpronounced, resulting, for example, in "poun(d)" and "las(t)".

In extremely traditional and conservative accents (e.g. Mícheál Ó Muircheartaigh and Jackie Healy-Rae), prevocalic  can also be an alveolar flap, .  may be guttural (uvular) in north-east Leinster.

 is used here to represent the voiceless alveolar non-sibilant fricative, sometimes known as a "slit fricative", which is apico-alveolar.

 Vowels +  combinations 
The following vowels +  combinations are defining characteristics of Hiberno-English: 

The distribution of  versus  is listed below in some example words:certain 
chirp 
circle 
earn 
earth 
girl 
germ 
heard or herd 
Hertz 
irk 
tern bird 
dirt 
first 
hurts 
murder 
nurse 
turn 
third or turd 
urn 
work 
world 

Vocabulary

Loan words from Irish
A number of Irish language loan words are used in Hiberno-English, particularly in an official state capacity. For example, the head of government is the Taoiseach, the deputy head is the Tánaiste, the parliament is the Oireachtas and its lower house is Dáil Éireann. Less formally, people also use loan words in day-to-day speech, although this has been on the wane in recent decades and among the young.

 Derived words from Irish 
Another group of Hiberno-English words are those derived from the Irish language. Some are words in English that have entered into general use, while others are unique to Ireland. These words and phrases are often Anglicised versions of words in Irish or direct translations into English. In the latter case, they often give meaning to a word or phrase that is generally not found in wider English use.

Derived words from Old and Middle English
Another class of vocabulary found in Hiberno-English are words and phrases common in Old and Middle English, but which have since become obscure or obsolete in the modern English language generally. Hiberno-English has also developed particular meanings for words that are still in common use in English generally.

Other words
In addition to the three groups above, there are also additional words and phrases whose origin is disputed or unknown. While this group may not be unique to Ireland, their usage is not widespread, and could be seen as characteristic of the language in Ireland.

Grammar and syntax
The syntax of the Irish language is quite different from that of English. Various aspects of Irish syntax have influenced Hiberno-English, though many of these idiosyncrasies are disappearing in suburban areas and among the younger population.

The other major influence on Hiberno-English that sets it apart from modern English in general is the retention of words and phrases from Old- and Middle-English.

From Irish

Reduplication
Reduplication is an alleged trait of Hiberno-English strongly associated with Stage Irish and Hollywood films.

 the Irish ar bith corresponds to English "at all", so the stronger ar chor ar bith gives rise to the form "at all at all".
"I've no time at all at all."
 ar eagla go … (lit. "on fear that …") means "in case …". The variant ar eagla na heagla, (lit. "on fear of fear") implies the circumstances are more unlikely. The corresponding Hiberno-English phrases are "to be sure" and the very rarely used "to be sure to be sure". In this context, these are not, as might be thought, disjuncts meaning "certainly"; they could better be translated "in case" and "just in case". Nowadays normally spoken with conscious levity.
 "I brought some cash in case I saw a bargain, and my credit card to be sure to be sure."

Yes and no
Irish has no words that directly translate as "yes" or "no", and instead repeats the verb used in the question, negated if necessary, to answer. Hiberno-English uses "yes" and "no" less frequently than other English dialects as speakers can repeat the verb, positively or negatively, instead of (or in redundant addition to) using "yes" or "no".

 "Are you coming home soon?" – "I am."
 "Is your mobile charged?" – "It isn't."

This is not limited only to the verb to be: it is also used with to have when used as an auxiliary; and, with other verbs, the verb to do is used. This is most commonly used for intensification, especially in Ulster English.
 "This is strong stuff, so it is."
 "We won the game, so we did."

Recent past construction
Irish indicates recency of an action by adding "after" to the present continuous (a verb ending in "-ing"), a construction known as the "hot news perfect" or "after perfect".
 "Why did you hit him?" – "He was after giving me cheek." (he had [just beforehand] been cheeky to me).
A similar construction is seen where exclamation is used in describing a recent event:
 "I'm after hitting him with the car!" 
 "She's after losing five stone in five weeks!"
"Tá sí tar éis cúig chloch a chailleadh i gcúig seachtaine!" 

When describing less astonishing or significant events, a structure resembling the German perfect can be seen:
 "I have the car fixed." 
 "I have my breakfast eaten." 

This correlates with an analysis of "H1 Irish" proposed by Adger & Mitrovic, in a deliberate parallel to the status of German as a V2 language.

Recent past construction has been directly adopted into Newfoundland English, where it is common in both formal and casual register. In rural areas of the Avalon peninsula, where Newfoundland Irish was spoken until the early 20th century, it is the grammatical standard for describing whether or not an action has occurred.

Reflection for emphasis
The reflexive version of pronouns is often used for emphasis or to refer indirectly to a particular person, etc., according to context. Herself, for example, might refer to the speaker's boss or to the woman of the house. Use of herself or himself in this way can imply status or even some arrogance of the person in question. Note also the indirectness of this construction relative to, for example, She's coming now. This reflexive pronoun can also be used in a more neutral sense to describe a person's spouse or partner – "I was with himself last night" or "How's herself doing?"
 "'Tis herself that's coming now." Is í féin atá ag teacht anois.
 "Was it all of ye or just yourself?" An sibhse ar fad nó tusa féin a bhí i gceist?

Prepositional pronouns
There are some language forms that stem from the fact that there is no verb to have in Irish. Instead, possession is indicated in Irish by using the preposition at, (in Irish, ag.). To be more precise, Irish uses a prepositional pronoun that combines ag "at" and mé "me" to create agam. In English, the verb "to have" is used, along with a "with me" or "on me" that derives from Tá … agam. This gives rise to the frequent
 "Do you have the book?" – "I have it with me."
 "Have you change for the bus on you?"
 "He will not shut up if he has drink taken."
Somebody who can speak a language "has" a language, in which Hiberno-English has borrowed the grammatical form used in Irish.
 "She does not have Irish." Níl Gaeilge aici. literally "There is no Irish at her".

When describing something, many Hiberno-English speakers use the term "in it" where "there" would usually be used. This is due to the Irish word ann (pronounced "oun" or "on") fulfilling both meanings.
 "Is it yourself that is in it?" An tú féin atá ann?
 "Is there any milk in it?" An bhfuil bainne ann?

Another idiom is this thing or that thing described as "this man here" or "that man there", which also features in Newfoundland English in Canada.
 "This man here." An fear seo. (cf. the related anseo = here)
 "That man there." An fear sin. (cf. the related ansin = there)

Conditionals have a greater presence in Hiberno-English due to the tendency to replace the simple present tense with the conditional (would) and the simple past tense with the conditional perfect (would have).
 "John asked me would I buy a loaf of bread." (John asked me to buy a loaf of bread.)
 "How do you know him? We would have been in school together." (We were in school together.)Bring and take: Irish use of these words differs from that of British English because it follows the Irish grammar for beir and tóg. English usage is determined by direction; a person determines Irish usage. So, in English, one takes "from here to there", and brings it "to here from there". In Irish, a person takes only when accepting a transfer of possession of the object from someone elseand a person brings at all other times, irrespective of direction (to or from).
 Don't forget to bring your umbrella with you when you leave.
 (To a child) Hold my hand: I don't want someone to take you.

To be

The Irish equivalent of the verb "to be" has two present tenses, one (the present tense proper or "aimsir láithreach") for cases which are generally true or are true at the time of speaking and the other (the habitual present or "aimsir ghnáthláithreach") for repeated actions. Thus, "you are [now, or generally]" is tá tú, but "you are [repeatedly]" is bíonn tú. Both forms are used with the verbal noun (equivalent to the English present participle) to create compound tenses. This is similar to the distinction between ser and estar in Spanish or the use of the 'habitual be' in African-American Vernacular English.

The corresponding usage in English is frequently found in rural areas, especially Mayo/Sligo in the west of Ireland and Wexford in the south-east, Inner-City Dublin and Cork city along with border areas of the North and Republic. In this form, the verb "to be" in English is similar to its use in Irish, with a "does be/do be" (or "bees", although less frequently) construction to indicate the continuous, or habitual, present:
 "He does be working every day." Bíonn sé ag obair gach lá.
 "They do be talking on their mobiles a lot." Bíonn siad ag caint go minic ar a bhfóin póca.
 "He does be doing a lot of work at school." Bíonn sé ag déanamh go leor oibre ar scoil.
 "It's him I do be thinking of." Is air a bhíonn mé ag smaoineamh.

From Old and Middle English

In old-fashioned usage, "it is" can be freely abbreviated ’tis, even as a standalone sentence. This also allows the double contraction ’tisn’t, for "it is not".

Irish has separate forms for the second person singular (tú) and the second person plural (sibh).
Mirroring Irish, and almost every other Indo-European language, the plural you is also distinguished from the singular in Hiberno-English, normally by use of the otherwise archaic English word ye ; the word yous (sometimes written as youse) also occurs, but primarily only in Dublin and across Ulster. In addition, in some areas in Leinster, north Connacht and parts of Ulster, the hybrid word ye-s, pronounced "yiz", may be used. The pronunciation differs with that of the northwestern being  and the Leinster pronunciation being .

 "Did ye all go to see it?" Ar imigh sibh go léir chun é a fheicint?
 "None of youse have a clue!" Níl ciall/leid ar bith agaibh!
 "Are ye not finished yet?" Nach bhfuil sibh críochnaithe fós?
 "Yis are after destroying it!" Tá sibh tar éis é a scriosadh!

The word ye, yis or yous, otherwise archaic, is still used in place of "you" for the second-person plural, e.g. "Where are yous going?" Ye'r, Yisser or Yousser are the possessive forms.

The verb mitch is very common in Ireland, indicating being truant from school. This word appears in Shakespeare (though he wrote in Early Modern English rather than Middle English), but is seldom heard these days in British English, although pockets of usage persist in some areas (notably South Wales, Devon, and Cornwall). In parts of Connacht and Ulster the mitch is often replaced by the verb scheme, while in Dublin it is often replaced by "on the hop/bounce".

Another usage familiar from Shakespeare is the inclusion of the second person pronoun after the imperative form of a verb, as in "Wife, go you to her ere you go to bed" (Romeo and Juliet, Act III, Scene IV). This is still common in Ulster: "Get youse your homework done or you're no goin' out!" In Munster, you will still hear children being told, "Up to bed, let ye" .

For influence from Scotland, see Ulster Scots and Ulster English.

Other grammatical influencesNow is often used at the end of sentences or phrases as a semantically empty word, completing an utterance without contributing any apparent meaning. Examples include "Bye now" (= "Goodbye"), "There you go now" (when giving someone something), "Ah now!" (expressing dismay), "Hold on now" (= "wait a minute"), "Now then" as a mild attention-getter, etc. This usage is universal among English dialects, but occurs more frequently in Hiberno-English. It is also used in the manner of the Italian 'prego' or German 'bitte', for example, a barman might say "Now, Sir." when delivering drinks.So is often used for emphasis ("I can speak Irish, so I can"), or it may be tacked onto the end of a sentence to indicate agreement, where "then" would often be used in Standard English ("Bye so", "Let's go so", "That's fine so", "We'll do that so"). The word is also used to contradict a negative statement ("You're not pushing hard enough" – "I am so!"). (This contradiction of a negative is also seen in American English, though not as often as "I am too", or "Yes, I am".) The practice of indicating emphasis with so and including reduplicating the sentence's subject pronoun and auxiliary verb (is, are, have, has, can, etc.) such as in the initial example, is particularly prevalent in more northern dialects such as those of Sligo, Mayo and the counties of Ulster.Sure/Surely is often used as a tag word, emphasising the obviousness of the statement, roughly translating as but/and/well/indeed. It can be used as "to be sure" (but note that the other stereotype of "Sure and …" is not actually used in Ireland.) Or "Sure, I can just go on Wednesday", "I will not, to be sure." The word is also used at the end of sentences (primarily in Munster), for instance, "I was only here five minutes ago, sure!" and can express emphasis or indignation. In Ulster, the reply "Aye, surely" may be given to show strong agreement.To is often omitted from sentences where it would exist in British English. For example, "I'm not allowed go out tonight", instead of "I'm not allowed to go out tonight".Will is often used where British English would use "shall" or American English "should" (as in "Will I make us a cup of tea?"). The distinction between "shall" (for first-person simple future, and second- and third-person emphatic future) and "will" (second- and third-person simple future, first-person emphatic future), maintained by many in England, does not exist in Hiberno-English, with "will" generally used in all cases.Once''' is sometimes used in a different way from how it is used in other dialects; in this usage, it indicates a combination of logical and causal conditionality: "I have no problem laughing at myself once the joke is funny." Other dialects of English would probably use "if" in this situation.

See also

 English language in Europe
 Highland English
 Kiltartanese
 Languages of Ireland
 Manx English
 Regional accents of English
 Welsh English

Notes

References

Bibliography

Further reading

External links

Everyday English and Slang in Ireland

Languages attested from the 12th century
Dialects of English
English
British English
English